The 1996–97 Slovak First Football League was the fourth season of first-tier football league in Slovakia, since its establishment in 1993. This season started on 3 August 1996 and ended on 11 June 1997. Slovan Bratislava are the defending champions.

Teams
A total of 16 teams was contested in the league, including 12 sides from the 1995–96 season and four promoted from the 2. Liga.

No team was relegated to the 1996–97 2. Liga due to the decision of the organization of 1. Liga, that the number of teams in the league should be expanded from 12 to 16 teams from that season. The fourth teams who are promoted from 1995–96 2. Liga are Artmedia Petržalka, MŠK Žilina, Rimavská Sobota and ZTS Kerametal Dubnica.

Stadiums and locations

League table

Results

Season statistics

Top scorers

See also
1996–97 Slovak Cup
1996–97 2. Liga (Slovakia)

References

(RSSSF)

Slovak Super Liga seasons
Slovak
1